Póvoa de Varzim Bullfighting Arena WAS a bullring (Portuguese: Praça de Touros) in Póvoa de Varzim, Portugal. It is located on Avenida Vasco da Gama, on the northern waterfront of the city. Bullfighting, horse shows, and concerts are held in the arena.

The arena opened in 1949 and has a seating capacity of 6,097 regular seats and 150 chairs. Since 1984, it is a municipal venue owned by Varzim Lazer, a municipal company. It was built using functionalist architecture with a tendency to geometrical artistic expression.

Póvoa de Varzim Bullring has the most important bullfighting tradition in Northern Portugal, some of its Portuguese-style corridas are broadcast in national television and some of its events met with strong opposition from animal welfare activists, such as the Portuguese group Animal and PETA. The bullring includes the Salvação Barreto Bullfighting Museum, paying homage to the creator and manager of the bullring and a mythical forcado or bull-grabber who participated in the 1951 epic Quo Vadis as a gladiator fighting a bull.

History

Early arenas

The existence of a bullring in Póvoa de Varzim is attested in the 1793 celebrations of the birth of Teresa of Braganza, daughter of King John VI. The wooden bullring was located in Campo das Cobras (Snakes field). In the 19th century, bullfighting and horse shows occurred in Castelo da Póvoa fortress.

Permanent location and increasing popularity
In Alto de Martim Vaz, at the beginning of the 20th century,  the Gomes de Amorim stadium was used as a bullfighting arena and for horse shows. The project for a permanent bullring in Póvoa de Varzim occurred during the Estado Novo regime, under the influence of Salvação Barreto, a notable forcado, the manager of Casino da Póvoa. The contemporary and functionalist project was designed by architect Alfredo Coelho de Magalhães in February 1949 and located just off Alto de Martim Vaz. It was owned by Empresa de Recreios da Póvoa de Varzim, ltd.

The bullring was built using stone and concrete, with the exception of the tiered rows of stands built as a wood structure. Nevertheless, the project allowed later changes in the stands structure. Construction was fast, its popularity also came fast. The first corrida took place on June 19, 1949, with a competition between the bullfighting horsemen (cavaleiros):  Simão da Veiga Jr. and José Rosa Rodrigues, the matadores Manuel dos Santos e Manolo Navarro, and the great bull-grabbers of Santarém, Alpoim, Gois and Correia. During bullfighting afternoons, Póvoa got thousands of visitors from South and Northern Portugal and Spain.

Salvação Barreto participated in the 1951 American film Quo Vadis. The action takes place in ancient Rome and Salvação Barreto staged as a gladiator fighting a bull and saving a lady that was thrown to the beasts. In 1959, the rows of stands were rebuilt using concrete, a work by the engineer Mário Fernandes da Ponte, keeping the same total capacity, without any other changes. With the knowledge and passion of Artur Aires and Salvação Barreto, the bullring had some of the most glorious days of the Portuguese bullfighting history.

Acquisition by the city hall
It was bought by the City Hall of Póvoa de Varzim on May 23, 1984 to Empresa de Recreios da Póvoa de Varzim. The purchase included the book and museum collection of the Bullfighting Library Biblioteca Tauromática, an offer to the city by Salvação Barreto. The library and museum are housed in the bullring since 1962. The city hall paying homage to Salvação Barreto named the bullfighting museum as Museu Tauromático Salvação Barreto. The Clube Taurino Povoense group was created in 1994 in Rua dos Pescadores aiming to preserve the bullfighting activities.

Corrida TV Norte, Brazilian rodeos and the anti-bullfighting movement  

A project to build a roof over the bullring was presented in late 20th century by the German engineer Rudolf Bergman, who designed the roof of the Olympic Stadium in Berlin and the Waldstation in Frankfurt. The engineer's project included bars, restaurants and other services, and was considered relevant for tourism, but the project was canceled due to lack of funding. In 2008, a German businessman, supporting the end of bullfighting, proposed to transform the Praça into a biergarten, a leisure, entertainment and culture venue similar to the one in Munich in Germany.

The importance that the local bullfighting shows has for the popularity of tauromachy in Northern Portugal, with Corrida TV Norte being one of the most important national corridas, and the creation of a new non-traditional show, the Brazilian rodeo that in the II Rodeo Country Bulls (2004), increased the outcry of animal welfare associations, Brazilian rodeos stopped being presented, but this didn't stopped that PETA (People for the Ethical Treatment of Animals), a major international organization, the Portuguese Animal and the Scottish Advocate for Animals protesting there during the 2005 Corrida TV Norte. Between 1997 and 2015, a Garraida was held in the Póvoa de Varzim arena, with young bulls and higher education students. It occurred in early May as part of Porto's student festivities - the Queima das Fitas. This was not a violent bullfight, but rather playing with bulls and part of Porto's student festivities since 1948. These ended following student pressure, regular protests near the bullring and declining student attendance.

Violence to animals banned 
The 2017 local elections saw the rise of the People–Animals–Nature (PAN) party, whose main objective was the end of bullfightings in Póvoa de Varzim, becoming the fourth most-voted party for the city hall with 3.94%. Following local pressure and the planned transformation of the arena into an events venue, the city hall of Póvoa de Varzim banned bullfights and other shows that are violent to animals starting from 1 January 2019. This sent shockwaves across the bullfighting world, and Prótoiro joined efforts with Spanish and French counterparts to take the city hall to court, saying that bullfighting is part of Portuguese culture. In September, the court in Porto ruled that the ban was unconstitutional.

Events

The most important run in the bullring was a Portuguese-style bullfighting known as Grande Corrida TV Norte (TV's Great Run - North) in late July by the Portuguese public broadcaster, RTP. Several others are held till 2018, including an 18th-century-style show with horsewomen.

The bullring also hosts a popular music show in the summer - the Noites de Verão (Summer evenings), quite popular in Coastal Northern Portugal, with popular music sung in Portuguese, mostly with famed Portuguese and Brazilian musicians. The event is organized by Rádio Onda Viva and held since the late 1990s.

References

Buildings and structures in Póvoa de Varzim
Bullrings in Portugal
Sport in Póvoa de Varzim
Sports venues in Porto District
Sports venues completed in 1949
Modernist architecture in Portugal